Heel hook may refer to:
 Heel hook, in grappling
 A climbing technique